Ganinyi is a small Aboriginal community 110 km west of Halls Creek in the Kimberley region of Western Australia, within the Shire of Halls Creek.

Education 
Children of school age at Ganinyi attend the Yiyili Community School. The school caters for students in kindergarten to Year 10 from Yiyili and the surrounding outstations of Ganinyi, Girriyoowa, Goolgaradah, Kurinyjarn, and Rocky Springs. In 2010 there were 72 students enrolled. A daily bus service operated by the school collects students from other nearby communities including Moongardie 30 km distant. The school provides lunch for students. Students who progress beyond Year 10 attend boarding school in Darwin and other larger towns.

Native title 
The community is located within the registered area of the Gooniyandi Combined #2 (WAD6008/2000) native title claim.

Governance 
The community is managed through its incorporated body, Ganinyi Aboriginal Corporation, incorporated under the Aboriginal Councils and Associations Act 1976 on 23 November 1988.

Town planning 
Ganinyi does not have its on Layout Plan, but comes under the Yiyili including Ganinyi, Girriyoowa and Kurinyjarn Layout Plan No.2. This was prepared in accordance with State Planning Policy 3.2 Aboriginal Settlements, and was endorsed by the Ganinyi community on 2 December 2010, and by the Western Australian Planning Commission in on 29 September 2011.

The Layout Plan map-set and background report can be viewed at Planning Western Australia's web site.

External links 
 Planning Western Australia's official site – Yiyili Layout Plan, https://www.dplh.wa.gov.au/information-and-services/state-planning/aboriginal-communities/aboriginal-community-maps/layout-plans

References

Towns in Western Australia
Aboriginal communities in Kimberley (Western Australia)